The Best American Short Stories 2004, a volume in The Best American Short Stories series, was edited by Katrina Kenison and by guest editor Lorrie Moore.

Short Stories included

Other notable stories

Among the other notable writers whose stories were among the "100 Other Distinguished Stories of 2003" were Max Apple, Kevin Brockmeier, Dan Chaon, Stephen King, Arthur Miller, Joyce Carol Oates and Joy Williams.

Notes

2004 anthologies
Fiction anthologies
Short Stories 2004
Houghton Mifflin books